Shorea pinanga is a tree in the family Dipterocarpaceae, native to Borneo. The specific epithet pinanga is derived from a local name for the species.

Description
The brown to pinkish bark is initially smooth, later becoming cracked and flaky. The inflorescences bear pink flowers.

Distribution and habitat
Shorea pinanga is endemic to Borneo.

Conservation
Shorea pinanga has been assessed as least concern on the IUCN Red List. Although the species population is declining, it is still considered abundant. The species is used for its timber. Shorea pinanga occurs in a number of protected areas.

References

pinanga
Endemic flora of Borneo
Plants described in 1870
Taxa named by Rudolph Scheffer